Odense is an unincorporated community in Neosho County, Kansas, United States.

History
Odense had a post office from the 1870s until 1902. The community was named after Odense, in Denmark.

References

Further reading

External links
 Neosho County maps: Current, Historic, KDOT

Unincorporated communities in Neosho County, Kansas
Unincorporated communities in Kansas